The 2010–11 KNVB Cup was the 93rd season of the Dutch national football knockout tournament. The competition began on 18 August 2010 with the matches of Round 1 and ended with the final on 8 May 2011. AFC Ajax were the defending champions.
The winners of the competition qualify for the play-off round of the 2011–12 UEFA Europa League.
FC Twente claimed the cup after a 3–2 edge win over Ajax Amsterdam.

Calendar
The calendar for the remaining rounds of the 2010–11 KNVB Cup, as announced by the KNVB was as follows.

First round
Four amateur clubs competed in this stage of the competition for two places in the Second Round. These matches took place on 18 August 2010.

|}

Second round
The two winners from the First Round and the 52 other amateur club participants entered in this round of the tournament. These matches took place on 25 August 2010.

|}

Third round
The 27 winners from the Second Round entered this stage of the competition along with Oss, the 18 Eerste Divisie clubs and the 18 Eredivisie clubs. These matches took place from 21 to 23 September 2010.

|}

Fourth round
These matches took place between 9 and 11 November 2010.

|}

Fifth round
These matches took place between 21 and 23 December 2010.

|}

Quarter finals
These matches took place between 25 and 27 January 2011.

|}

Semi finals
These matches were played between 2 and 3 March 2011.

Final

References

External links
 Official site 

2010-11
2010–11 domestic association football cups
2010–11 in Dutch football